The 1974–75 Egyptian Premier League, was the 19th season of the Egyptian Premier League, the top Egyptian professional league for association football clubs, since its establishment in 1948. The season started on 6 September 1974 and concluded on 6 April 1975.
Al Ahly managed to win the league for the 12th time in the club's history.

League table

 (C)= Champion, (R)= Relegated, Pld = Matches played; W = Matches won; D = Matches drawn; L = Matches lost; F = Goals for; A = Goals against; ± = Goal difference; Pts = Points.

Top goalscorers

Teams location

References

External links 
 All Egyptian Competitions Info

5
1974–75 in African association football leagues
1974–75 in Egyptian football